USF may refer to:

Universities
 University of Saint Francis (Indiana), Ft. Wayne, Indiana
 University of San Francisco, California
 University of South Florida, Tampa, Florida
 University of St. Francis, Joliet, Illinois
 University of Sioux Falls, South Dakota

Locations
 Universal Studios Florida, a theme park in Orlando, Florida

File formats
 Universal Subtitle Format
 Nintendo Ultra 64 Sound Format

Other uses
 Ukrainian Shooting Federation, national governing body for shooting sports in Ukraine
 Universal Service Fund, a United States government program
 Upstream stimulatory factor, DNA-binding proteins regulating gene expression, see USF1 and USF2
 USAfrica Airways, defunct airline

See also